The Gold Coast Motorail was an Australian passenger train operated by the Public Transport Commission from March 1973 until February 1990.

It operated from Sydney via the North Coast line to Murwillumbah. It departed Central railway station in Sydney. It was formed of air-conditioned HUB/RUB sitting carriages along with stainless steel sleepers as well as having a motorail facility. Its headcode was NL3/NL4.

In May 1987, it was renamed the Pacific Coast Motorail. In February 1990 it was replaced by an unnamed XPT service.

References

Named passenger trains of New South Wales
Night trains of Australia
Passenger rail transport in New South Wales
Railway services introduced in 1973
Railway services discontinued in 1990
1973 establishments in Australia
1990 disestablishments in Australia
Motorail
Discontinued railway services in Australia